The 2009 Israeli legislative election was held using closed list proportional representation. Each party presented a list of candidates to the Central Elections Committee prior to the election.

Balad 
Jamal Zahalka
Said Nafa
Haneen Zoabi
Abbas Zakour
Oonie Tuma

Hadash 
Mohammad Barakeh
Hana Sweid
Dov Khenin
Afu Agbaria
Aida Touma-Suleiman

The Jewish Home 
Daniel Hershkowitz
Zevulun Orlev
Uri Orbach
Nissan Slomiansky
Sar Shalom Gerbi

Kadima 
Tzipi Livni
Shaul Mofaz
Dalia Itzik
Tzachi Hanegbi
Roni Bar-On
Ze'ev Boim
Meir Sheetrit
Ruhama Avraham
Avi Dichter
Marina Solodkin
Yoel Hasson
Gideon Ezra
Yaakov Edri
Eli Aflalo
Ze'ev Bielski
Ronit Tirosh
Haim Ramon
Nachman Shai
Shlomo Molla
Robert Tiviaev
Majalli Wahabi
Rachel Adato
Yohanan Plesner
Shai Hermesh
Yisrael Hasson
Aryeh Bibi
Otniel Schneller
Orit Zuaretz
Yulia Shamalov-Berkovich
Nino Abesadze
Avner Barazani
Doron Avital
Avi Duan
Yuval Zellner
Akram Hasson
Ahmed Dabbah
David Tal
Dimitri Rusinski
Aharon Ben Hamo
Eitan Shalom

Labor 
Ehud Barak
Isaac Herzog
Ophir Pines-Paz
Avishay Braverman
Shelly Yachimovich
Matan Vilnai
Eitan Cabel
Binyamin Ben-Eliezer
Yuli Tamir
Amir Peretz
Daniel Ben-Simon
Shalom Simhon
Orit Noked
Einat Wilf
Raleb Majadele
Shachiv Shnaan
Yoram Marciano
Leon Litinetsky
Colette Avital
Moshe Samia
Yosef Sulimani
Arik Hadad

Likud 
Benjamin Netanyahu
Gideon Sa'ar
Gilad Erdan
Reuven Rivlin
Benny Begin
Moshe Kahlon
Silvan Shalom
Moshe Ya'alon
Yuval Steinitz
Lea Nass
Israel Katz
Yuli Edelstein
Limor Livnat
Haim Katz
Yossi Peled
Michael Eitan
Dan Meridor
Tzipi Hotovely
Gila Gamliel
Ze'ev Elkin
Yariv Levin
Zion Pinyan
Ayoob Kara
Danny Danon
Carmel Shama
Ofir Akunis
Miri Regev
Alali Adamso

David Even Tzur
Keti Shitrit
Keren Barak

National Union 
Ya'akov Katz
Uri Ariel
Aryeh Eldad
Michael Ben-Ari
Uri Bank
Alon Davidi

New Movement-Meretz 
Haim Oron
Ilan Gilon
Nitzan Horowitz
Zahava Gal-On
Mossi Raz
Avshalom Vilan

Ra'am-Ta'al 
Ibrahim Sarsur
Ahmad Tibi
Taleb el-Sana
Masud Ghnaim
Talab Abu Arar

Shas 
Eli Yishai
Ariel Atias
Yitzhak Cohen
Amnon Cohen
Meshulam Nahari
Ya'akov Margi
David Azulai
Yitzhak Vaknin
Nissim Ze'ev
Haim Amsalem
Avraham Michaeli
Mazor Bahaina
Refael Cohen

United Torah Judaism 
Yaakov Litzman
Moshe Gafni
Meir Porush
Uri Maklev
Eliezer Moses
Yisrael Eichler
Menachem Carmel
Yaakov Gutterman

Yisrael Beiteinu 
Avigdor Lieberman
Uzi Landau
Stas Misezhnikov
Yitzhak Aharonovich
Sofa Landver
Orly Levy
Danny Ayalon
David Rotem
Anastassia Michaeli
Faina Kirschenbaum
Robert Ilatov
Hamad Amar
Moshe Matalon
Lia Shemtov
Alex Miller
Yitzhak Slavin

External links
Official website

2009